The Little Company of Mary is a Roman Catholic religious institute of women (also referred to as the Blue Sisters) dedicated to caring for the suffering, the sick and the dying. The order was founded in 1877 in Nottingham, England by Venerable Mary Potter.

This religious institute is distinct from Company of Mary–an institute for men (also Roman Catholic) founded by Saint Louis de Montfort in 1713–and the Sisters of the Company of Mary, Our Lady–a women's religious order founded by Saint Jeanne de Lestonnac in 1607.

History
The Little Company of Mary began in 1877, in an abandoned factory in Hyson Green, Nottingham.
Their principal work was the care of the sick and dying.

In 1882, they went to Italy. Mary Potter had gone to gain approval for the constitutions of her new congregation, and while there she established Calvary Hospital on the Via S Stefano Rotondo, not far from St. John Lateran.

In 1885, at the request of Cardinal Francis Moran in Sydney, Australia, six sisters traveled by ship to Australia, establishing a community there. Under the leadership of Mother Mary Xavier Lynch, the first provincial for Australasia, the order grew and established numerous hospitals in Australia and New Zealand.  She also oversaw the founding of a hospital in Port Elizabeth, South Africa.  In 1888, the sisters expanded their work to Ireland.  

In 1893, three Little Company of Mary sisters arrived in Chicago to begin their ministry in the United States, providing home-based hospice care.  In 1930 Little Company of Mary Hospital was founded in Evergreen Park, Illinois.  As of 2019, there were sisters working in California, Illinois, Indiana and Ohio. Their healthcare ministries include hospitals, home care, hospice, extended care, and outreach programs.

By 1922, the Little Company of Mary congregation had grown large enough to establish provinces with regional provincials. The four provinces were Australasia, England, Ireland and Italy.

See also
Little Company of Mary Health Care (Australia)
Sisters of Finding Jesus in the Temple

References

External links
 Little Company of Mary

Religious organizations established in 1877
Catholic female orders and societies
Catholic religious institutes established in the 19th century
1877 establishments in England